Kinnickinnic State Park is a  Wisconsin state park in which the Kinnickinnic River, locally known as Kinni River, joins the St. Croix River.  The mouth of the Kinnickinnic River forms a sandy delta upon which boaters can picnic and camp.

Flora and fauna 
The banks of the Kinnickinnic River are lined with Weymouth pine trees. River is rich with trout.

Over 140 species of birds visit the Kinnickinnic Valley  during the bird migration, such as anseriformes. In the summer months the number drops to 85-90 mostly represented by  pheasants and Grey partridge. In addition, there are also bald eagles in the winter months. In 1989 wild turkeys  were resettled in the State Park.

The mammal wildlife that frequent Kinnickinnic State Park include various species of white-tailed deers, raccoons, American minks, red- and gray fox, Eurasian red squirrel, rabbit, weasel and North American beaver.

References

External links
Kinnickinnic State Park official site.

Protected areas of Pierce County, Wisconsin
State parks of Wisconsin
Protected areas established in 1972
1972 establishments in Wisconsin